This is a list of magistrates of Kinmen County. The incumbent Magistrate is independent Chen Fu-hai since 25 December 2022.

List of Magistrates

Timeline

See also
 Kinmen County

References

Kinmen County